Kačerginė  is a small town  west of Kaunas. The town of Kačerginė is located in Kaunas County, central Lithuania. Kačerginė was officially proclaimed a health resort in 1933. The only in Lithuania motor racing circuit Nemuno Žiedas was opened in 1960. As of 2015 it had a population of 790.

References

This article was initially translated from the Lithuanian Wikipedia.

External links
Website of Kačerginė

Towns in Lithuania
Towns in Kaunas County